The Ali-Sadr Cave, originally called Ali Saadr or Ali Sard (meaning cold), is the world's largest water cave which attracts thousands of visitors every year. It is located in Ali Sadr Kabudarahang County about 100 kilometers north of Hamadan, western Iran (more accurately at 48°18'E 35°18'N). Because of the cave's proximity to large cities such as Hamadan, it is a highly recommended destination for tourists from all corners of the world. Tours of the cave are available by pedalos. The Ali-Sadr cave was rediscovered by a shepherd from Ali-Sadr village in which the cave is located.

Description

Ali-Sadr is the world's largest water cave, where you sit in a boat and watch the view.
This cave is located at 48°18'E 35°18'N, in the southern part of Ali Sadr village. The cave is entered at the side of a hill called Sari Ghiyeh which also includes two other caves called Sarab and Soubashi, each 7 and 11 kilometers from Ali-Sadr Cave. Apparently, the water in Ali-Sadr cave stems from a spring in Sarab.

In the summer of 2001, a German/British expedition surveyed the cave, finding to be 11 kilometers long. The main chamber of the cave is 100 meters by 50 meters and 40 meters high.

The cave walls can extend up to 40 meters high, and it contains several large, deep lakes. The cave has a river flowing through it and most travel through the cave system is done by boat. More than 11 kilometers of the cave's water canals have been discovered so far. Some routes are 10 to 11 kilometers long and all lead to "The Island", a centrally located large atrium.

Early occupation
Excavations and archeological studies of the cave have led to the discovery of ancient artworks, jugs and pitchers dating back to 12,000 years ago. Animals, hunting scenes and bows and arrows are depicted on the walls and passages of the exit section. These images suggest mesolithic man used the cave as their abode. The cave was known during the reign of Darius I (521-485 BC) which can be verified by an old inscription at the entrance of the tunnel. However, the knowledge of the existence of the cave was lost and it was only rediscovered in 1963 by Iranian mountaineers.

Gallery

See also
 List of caves in Iran

References

External links

 Ghar Ali Sadr
 Publications of the Speläoclub Berlin (SCB)
 Das Iran Projekt "Ghar Alisadr"
 List of caves in Iran in Persian
 Alisadr Tourism Co. (The Official Website of Alisadr Cave)

Caves of Iran
Show caves in Iran
Landforms of Hamadan Province
Tourist attractions in Hamadan Province
Archaeological sites in Iran